Robert Herring may refer to:

 Robert Herring (poet) (1903–1975), British writer and poet
 Robert Herring (businessman), California businessman and founder of Wealth TV
 Robert Herring (RAF officer) (1896–1973), World War I flying ace
 Robert Herring (cricketer) (1898–1964), Australian cricketer